State Route 231 (SR 231) is a  long north–south state highway in the northwestern quadrant of the U.S. state of Ohio. SR 231 has its southern terminus at a CSX railroad crossing in the village of Morral.

Route description
The path of SR 231 takes it through northern Marion County, eastern Wyandot County and southern Seneca County.  There are no segments of SR 231 that are included within the National Highway System (NHS).  The NHS is a network of highways identified as being  most important for the economy, mobility and defense of the nation.

History
SR 231 was applied in 1923. The highway was originally a short connector route in the Nevada vicinity, running between the former SR 182, now County Road 182, CR 182, in Nevada and the old two-lane alignment of U.S. Route 30 (US 30), now designated as CR 330, north of the village.

In 1932, SR 231 was extended south along the routing that it presently utilizes south of Nevada to its current southern terminus in Morral.  Five years after being extended on the south ended, SR 231 was lengthened on the north end, following its present alignment along a previously county-maintained roadway to a new northern terminus at its present eastern junction with SR 103 east of Sycamore.  Then, in 1939, SR 231 was extended to the north one more time, via a concurrency with SR 103 and SR 67 and then along a previously un-numbered roadway to its present northern terminus in Tiffin.

Major intersections

See also

References

External links

231
231
231
231